The Javanese Malaysians are people of full or partial Javanese descent who were born in or immigrated to Malaysia. They form a significant part of Malaysia's population and Malaysian law considers most of them to be Malays. Malaysia is home to the largest Javanese population outside Indonesia.

The majority of Javanese Malaysians originated from Central Java; the first wave came during the Shailendra era from the sixth to ninth century, then during the Singhasari and Majapahit era from the twelfth to fourteenth century. There were also migrants from the Dutch East Indies looking for new opportunities in British Malaya. Despite many of them having arrived during the colonial era, there are also those who arrived during World War II to both Japanese-occupied British Malaya and Borneo as forced labour. In the present day, they live predominantly in the West Malaysian states of Johor, Perak and Selangor, with significant minorities found in East Malaysia, especially in the states of Sabah and Sarawak.

Most Malaysians of Javanese descent have assimilated into the local Malay culture and speak Malaysian as a native tongue and first language rather than the Javanese language of their ancestors. This occurs through usual assimilation, as well as intermarriages with other ethnic groups. This qualifies them as Malays under Malaysian law. The situation is identical with the Javanese in Singapore, where they are considered Malay.

References

Further reading
 
 

Javanese
Javanese people
M
 
 
Immigration to Malaysia